Andrew Burgher Michael Ker (born 16 October 1954 in Kelso, Scottish Borders) is a former Scotland international rugby union and former Scotland international cricket player.

Rugby Union career

Amateur career

He played for Kelso.

Provincial career

He played for South of Scotland.

International career

He was capped by Scotland 'B' against Italy 'B' on 7 December 1986.

He was given a full senior cap for the  rugby union team in 1988, becoming Scotland's oldest debutant at age 33.

Cricket career

He played several matches of cricket as a batsman for Scotland in the early 1980s. He scored 178 runs in first-class cricket at an average of 29.66, and 147 runs in List A cricket at an average of 21.00.

Teaching career

Ker worked as a schoolmaster.

See also

 List of Scottish cricket and rugby union players

References

Sources

 Bath, Richard (ed.) The Scotland Rugby Miscellany (Vision Sports Publishing Ltd, 2007 )
 Massie, Allan A Portrait of Scottish Rugby (Polygon, Edinburgh)

1954 births
Living people
Cricketers from Kelso
Kelso RFC players
Rugby union players from Kelso
Scotland international rugby union players
Scottish cricketers
Scottish rugby union players
South of Scotland District (rugby union) players
Scotland 'B' international rugby union players